Von Null auf 42 is a German television series.

See also
List of German television series

External links
 

2004 German television series debuts
2004 German television series endings
German sports television series
German-language television shows
Das Erste original programming